The West Bengal Chess Association (WBCA) the apex body for the game of chess in West Bengal, India, was dissolved in 2012 after the formation of the Bengal Chess Association. It was formed in the late 1959s and was affiliated with the All India Chess Federation.

Affiliates
The WBCA used to have a number of affiliated districts bodies, academies and clubs under it.

Affiliated District Associations
North 24 Parganas District Chess Association
South 24 Parganas District Chess Association
Howrah District Chess Association
Hooghly District Chess Association
Burdwan District Chess Association
Purba Midnapur District Chess Association
Jalpaiguri District Chess Association
Darjeeling District Chess Association
Murshidabad District Chess Association
Coochbihar District Chess Association
Uttar Dinajpur District Chess Association
Nadia District Chess Association

Affiliated Academies and Clubs
Alekhine Chess Club
Dibyendu Barua Chess Academy
Calcutta Chess Academy
Calcutta Chess Club
Behala Chess Club
Lake Town Cultural Organization
Sealdah Sports & Cultural Organization
Gariahat Chess Club
City Chess Forum
Pulse Chess Academy

Events
The WBCA had organised some notable events in the state.
On December 4 to 14, 1996, the WBCA organized for the first time in India the Commonwealth Open Chess Championship at Kolkata.
In 1999, the WBCA organised the National Age Group Chess Championship at Howrah.
In 2000, WBCA held All India Fide Rated Chess Tournament at Kolkata.

See also 
 Gariahat Chess Club

References

External links
Official Website of WBCA

Chess organizations
Chess in India
Sports organizations established in 1959
1959 establishments in West Bengal
Sport in West Bengal
Organisations based in West Bengal